Kang Dong-jin (강동진,  or  ; born 23 December 1987) is a South Korean professional racing cyclist. He rode at the 2015 UCI Track Cycling World Championships. He competed at the 2006 and 2014 Asian Games.

In 2010 he was suspended for two years after he failed a drug test for methyltestosterone doping.

References

External links

1987 births
Living people
South Korean male cyclists
Place of birth missing (living people)
Doping cases in cycling
Asian Games medalists in cycling
Cyclists at the 2006 Asian Games
Cyclists at the 2014 Asian Games
Cyclists at the 2016 Summer Olympics
Olympic cyclists of South Korea
Medalists at the 2006 Asian Games
Medalists at the 2014 Asian Games
Asian Games gold medalists for South Korea
Asian Games bronze medalists for South Korea